Pintail Island is one of the uninhabited Canadian arctic islands in Nunavut, Canada. It is located at the mouth of Chesterfield Inlet.

References

Islands of Chesterfield Inlet
Uninhabited islands of Kivalliq Region